Stampede is the eleventh studio album by Swiss hard rock band Krokus. It features an almost completely different line-up to that of their last album (with the exception of Fernando von Arb), and was recorded near the band's home town of Solothurn by Jürg Naegeli, a former member of the band.

It was also the first Krokus album since 1978's Painkiller not to feature Marc Storace on lead vocals. His replacement, Peter Tanner, had previously been a member of Swiss bands Witchcraft, Bloody Six and Headhunter as well as a voice actor in the late 1970s. Stampede is also marks the Krokus studio debut for Many Maurer, a bandmate of Tanner's in Headhunter and founding member of Killer. The album reached No. 18 in the Swiss album charts.

In 2000, Tanner and Storace would unite to record the D/C World album (with Tony Castell on bass), consisting of 5 strung together blocks of passages from 30 different AC/DC songs, with Tanner singing the Brian Johnson parts and Storace in the Bon Scott role.

Track listing
All songs by Fernando von Arb, Many Maurer and Peter Tanner, except where indicated
 "Stampede" – 4:41
 "Electric Man" – 5:24
 "Rock 'n' Roll Gypsy" – 4:35
 "Shotgun Boogie" (von Arb, Maurer, Tanner, Patrick Mason) – 5:25
 "Nova-Zano" (von Arb, Maurer, Tanner, Mason) – 6:28
 "Street Love" – 4:32
 "Good Times" – 4:43
 "She Drives Me Crazy" (von Arb, Maurer, Tanner, Mason) – 5:15
 "In the Heat of the Night" (von Arb) – 7:02
 "Rhythm of Love" (von Arb, Maurer, Tanner, Mason) – 5:24
 "Wasteland" (Maurer, Tanner) – 7:08

Personnel
Krokus
Peter Tanner – vocals
Many Maurer – lead guitar, bass, co-producer
Tony Castell – rhythm guitar, bass, backing vocals
Fernando von Arb – bass, acoustic guitar, electric guitar, keyboards, producer
Peter Haas – drums, percussion
Jurg Naegeli – keyboards, bass

Additional musicians
Rahel Studer – cello on "Nova-Zano"
Chris Egger – backing vocals

Production
Jürg Naegeli – engineer, mixing assistant
Pedro Haldemann – co-producer, mixing assistant
Hanspeter Huber – mixing at Soundville Studios, Lucern, Switzerland
Katrin Brändli –  mixing assistant
Ian Cooper – mastering at Townhouse Studios, London

Charts

References

External links
 Stampede page on the Krokus official website

Krokus (band) albums
1990 albums